Benito Armingol (7 September 1919 – 9 November 1971) was a Chilean footballer. He played in eight matches for the Chile national football team from 1942 to 1945. He was also part of Chile's squad for the 1942 South American Championship.

References

External links
 

1919 births
1971 deaths
Chilean footballers
Chile international footballers
Place of birth missing
Association football midfielders
Unión Española footballers